The Marchioness and Duchesses of Montferrat were the consorts of the rulers of a territory in Piedmont south of the Po and east of Turin called Montferrat. The March of Montferrat was created by Berengar II of Italy in 950 during a redistribution of power in the northwest of his kingdom. It was originally named after and held by the Aleramici. In 1574, Montferrat was raised to a Duchy by Maximilian II, Holy Roman Emperor (see Duchy of Montferrat).

Marchioness of Montferrat

House of Aleramici

House of Paleologi

Spanish occupation until 1536.

House of Gonzaga
In 1536 Charles V, Holy Roman Emperor granted the marquisate, despite competing claims from Savoy and from the Marquis of Saluzzo, to the Gonzagas. This was confirmed in 1559 by the Peace of Cateau-Cambrésis.

Duchess of Montferrat

House of Gonzaga
In 1574, Maximilian II, Holy Roman Emperor raised the Gonzaga marquis to a duke and the "march" became the Duchy of Montferrat.

House of Gonzaga-Nevers

See also
 List of Thessalonican consorts
 List of Mantuan consorts

References

Sources
 

Monferrato
 
 
Lists of Italian nobility
Lists of duchesses
Lists of marchionesses